Bollebygd is a locality and the seat of Bollebygd Municipality, Västra Götaland County, Sweden. It had 3,566 inhabitants in 2010. Between 1974 and 1994 it was in Borås Municipality.

Sports
The following sports clubs are located in Bollebygd:

 Bollebygds IF
 Hestrafors IF

References

External links 
Homepage of county council of Bollebygd

Populated places in Västra Götaland County
Populated places in Bollebygd Municipality
Municipal seats of Västra Götaland County
Swedish municipal seats